Damaine Anthony Radcliff (born June 7, 1979), is an American film actor who was born in The Bronx, New York City. Founder of Raining Giants, he is most known for his starring roles in the movies Glory Road, Step Up and as Executive Producer of Rambo: Last Blood and the feature film Tesla starring Ethan Hawke.  His sketch parodies on his YouTube Channel has garnered millions of views. Most recently, Damaine expanded his role as an Award-Winning TV Director for his work writing, producing, directing and starring in the independent pilot Up North, which the project won Best Actor, Best Pilot, Best Director, and the overall Audience Award voted on by all festival attendees at SeriesFest Season 3.

Filmography

References

External links
 
 
 

1979 births
Living people
African-American male actors
American male film actors
American male television actors
Male actors from New York City
People from the Bronx
21st-century African-American people
20th-century African-American people